Alberto González Moyano (born 1 June 1998) is a Spanish athlete specialising in the hammer throw. He represented his country at the 2019 World Championships without reaching the final. Earlier that year he won a gold medal at the 2019 European U23 Championships.

His personal best in the event is 75.78 metres set in Andújar in 2019.

International competitions

References

External links
 

1998 births
Living people
Spanish male hammer throwers
World Athletics Championships athletes for Spain
Sportspeople from Jaén, Spain
Athletes (track and field) at the 2022 Mediterranean Games